Jeffrey Vernon Hearron (born November 19, 1961) is an American former professional baseball catcher. He lives in Cerritos, California.

He was drafted by the Blue Jays in the 4th round of the 1983 Major League Baseball draft.

External links

1961 births
Living people
American expatriate baseball players in Canada
Baseball players from Long Beach, California
Florence Blue Jays players
Iowa Cubs players
Knoxville Blue Jays players
Las Vegas Stars (baseball) players
Major League Baseball catchers
Myrtle Beach Blue Jays players
Syracuse Chiefs players
Texas Longhorns baseball players
Toronto Blue Jays players
Cerritos Falcons baseball players